Åke Carlsson (24 October 1936 – 21 April 2007) was a Swedish wrestler. He competed in the men's freestyle welterweight at the 1960 Summer Olympics.

References

External links
 

1936 births
2007 deaths
Swedish male sport wrestlers
Olympic wrestlers of Sweden
Wrestlers at the 1960 Summer Olympics
Sportspeople from Västmanland County